Francis Joseph Bouillon (born October 17, 1975) is an American-Canadian former professional ice hockey defenseman who played 14 seasons in the National Hockey League (NHL) for the Montreal Canadiens and Nashville Predators. He also played a season for HC Ambrì-Piotta in the National League A (NLA), the top-tier league in Switzerland. He is currently a Development Coach for the Montreal Canadiens.

Early life
Bouillon was born in New York City to a Haitian father and a French Canadian mother. Bouillon moved to Quebec City, Quebec with his mother when he was only 3 years old. He played Junior hockey in the Quebec Major Junior Hockey League with the Laval Titans and the Granby Predateurs. He was Granby's captain when they won the 1996 Memorial Cup.

Playing career
Francis made his professional debut the 1996–97 season in the ECHL with the Wheeling Nailers and played the following season in the IHL with the Quebec Rafales before he was signed as a free agent to an NHL contract by the Montreal Canadiens in 1998.

He played the next 11 seasons, the majority of his career (except for a short stint with the Predators in 2002–03) within the Canadiens organization. At 5'8" and 194 lbs, Bouillon is considered small for an NHL defenseman but is never one to shy away from physical play. According to Pierre Houde, he is one of the strongest players in the NHL as shown by official physical tests.

On September 30, 2009, just prior to the 2009–10 season, Bouillon was signed to a one-year contract as a late inclusion to the Nashville Predators after joining the team on a tryout for training camp. In returning to the Predators after an initial four-game stint in 2002, Bouillon established himself within the Predators defense as a stay-at-home defenseman to appear in 81 games, missing only a single game, for 3 goals and 11 points. On June 18, 2010, he signed a two-year extension to remain with the Predators.

On July 1, 2012, Bouillon signed a one-year deal worth $1.5 million with the Montreal Canadiens.  His play during that season earned him a one-year extension with the team.  Following the 2013–14 season, the Canadiens declined to offer Bouillon a contract and on July 1, 2014, he became an unrestricted free agent.  Bouillon attended the Canadiens' training camp for the 2014–15 season on a tryout, but was released by the team on October 6, 2014.  On October 14, 2014, he signed with HC Ambrì-Piotta in the Swiss National League A.

He announced his retirement on September 25, 2015.

Personal life
Francis is separated from his wife Ginette with whom he has two sons, Michael and Anthony. Bouillon resides in Montreal with his girlfriend.

Career statistics

Regular season and playoffs

International

See also
List of Black ice hockey players

References

External links

1975 births
Living people
African-American ice hockey players
HC Ambrì-Piotta players
American emigrants to Canada
American men's ice hockey defensemen
American people of French-Canadian descent
American sportspeople of Haitian descent
Canadian sportspeople of Haitian descent
Granby Prédateurs players
Ice hockey players from New York (state)
Ice hockey people from Quebec City
Laval Titan Collège Français players
Laval Titan players
Leksands IF players
Montreal Canadiens coaches
Montreal Canadiens players
Montreal Roadrunners players
Nashville Predators players
Quebec Citadelles players
Quebec Rafales players
Sportspeople from New York City
Undrafted National Hockey League players
Wheeling Nailers players
21st-century African-American sportspeople
20th-century African-American sportspeople